Jamming in dance culture is a kind of informal show-off during a social dance party. Dancers clear a circle (jam circle or dance circle) and dancers or dance couples take turns showing their best tricks while the remaining dancers cheer the jammers on.  While some jam circles are staged, most form organically and spontaneously when the energy and mood is right.

Jam circles
The term originated during the swing era of dancing, probably borrowed or appeared in parallel with the expression "jam session" in music. Scenes with jamming may be seen in movies and musicals, such as Hellzapoppin. At the same time, this kind of dance behavior is not unusual in folk dances in various cultures all over the world and is often included in scenic performances when a group dance is interweaved with several solos. In Lindy hop, it is common for jam circles to take place on or around special occasions such as birthdays or weddings. In these cases, the person(s) being celebrated will usually stay in the circle for the duration of the jam and, rather than dance one song with one partner, will dance one song but swap partners many times throughout.

For Flamenco dancing, the circle is called a juerga.

Cypher circles
Specific to the bboying culture, cypher circles hold the similar concepts as jam circles.  When one or two bboys/bgirls get together to dance, it is known as jamming.  But when enough bboys/bgirls get together to make a circle where one can break in, it is known as "cyphering".  Cyphering takes place at nearly every bboying jam that takes place.  It is a way to show one's experience, the flavor they put into their style, and in some cases, specifically to "burn" or "smoke" another breaker.

Dance circles
A variant of the 'show case' style jam circles is a circle where dancers within the circle swap partners from the outside.  Less "showy" than a jam circle, these jams are to commemorate an occasion for the person(s) in the circle.  Another way to consider the difference is that while the jam circles showcase ability, the dance circles here showcase dancers.  For example, this kind of jam circle may be organized when a dancer from the local dance community celebrates a birthday, or is moving away.  Other occasions for these jams include a welcome dance for new members and/or visitors. Many of these circles are a planned portion of the evening.

The dancers of honor stay in the circle the whole time while other dancers from outside the circle cut in 'on the fly'.  Dancers "break in", or "steal", their way into the middle by breaking the connection of the dancers and inserting themselves such that the person of honor continues dancing without missing a beat.  Some scenes do this in an organized fashion (such as a line), however, many do so without rules.  Such birthday jams are common in swing dance and hustle communities in the United States but not unusual in salsa or tango.   While nerve-wracking for beginning dancers the jams do help to meet the local crowd.

Dance off

This form of jamming often occurs during prom, high school or college dance parties. What happens is that during the dances, the dancers would form a circle, and often, one by one, the dancers, individually or by a group, would come into the circle and display their dancing abilities. The style of dancing is popular amongst hip hop dancers.

Charleston jams
This variant of jam circle typically does not involve much of an audience.  While a few competitions have staged Charleston jams and competitions, almost always they happen on their own when a few dancers start doing solo Charleston next to each other.  Eventually the dancers form a circle and dance solo charleston while watching each other. These jams occur frequently at most Lindy Hop events.

See also
Jack and Jill (dance)
Mixer (dance)
Roda (dancing)

References

Dance culture
Social dance
20th-century dance